Jeanie Drynan  is an Australian film and television actress well known for her roles in the television series Class of '74 and in the 1994 film Muriel's Wedding. She may be best known to international viewers for her role as Muriel's mother in Muriel's Wedding, or as solicitor Angela Jeffries in the cult classic television series Prisoner Cell Block H.

Early life
Drynan studied acting at Edinburgh College of Speech and Drama (now Queen Margaret University) in Scotland, UK. She later trained at the National Institute of Dramatic Art (NIDA) in Australia.

Career
Drynan has twice been nominated for Australian Film Institute Awards; Best Supporting actress in 1994 for her role in Muriel's Wedding and in 1999 for the Best Actress Award for her role in Soft Fruit.

Filmography

FILM

TELEVISION

References

External links
 

Australian film actresses
Australian soap opera actresses
Australian stage actresses
Living people
Alumni of Queen Margaret University
20th-century Australian actresses
21st-century Australian actresses
1961 births